The NASA Centurion was the third aircraft developed as part of an evolutionary series of solar- and fuel-cell-system-powered unmanned aerial vehicles. AeroVironment, Inc. developed the vehicles under NASA's Environmental Research Aircraft and Sensor Technology (ERAST) program. They were built to develop the technologies that would allow long-term, high-altitude aircraft to serve as atmospheric satellites, to perform atmospheric research tasks as well as serve as communications platforms. It was developed from the NASA Pathfinder Plus aircraft and was developed into the NASA Helios.

Centurion

Centurion, originally built for the  altitude on solar power milestone specified by the ERAST project, was the third generation aircraft in the NASA Pathfinder series of electrical-powered flying wing unmanned aircraft. The ERAST program managers had determined that an aircraft based on the Pathfinder/Pathfinder Plus concept would be the lowest risk approach of achieving the altitude goal.

Initially, a quarter-scale model of the Centurion was test flown at El Mirage Dry Lake on March 4, 1997. The full-size Centurion's maiden flight took place at Rogers Dry Lake on November 10, 1998, and lasted a total of 1 hr and 24 minutes. The flight was nearly flawless and was followed by a second similar performance on November 19, this time before a crowd of VIPs and Media. It lasted 1 hr and 29 minutes. The third and final flight of the low altitude test series took place on December 3. Total flight time on this flight was 30 minutes, as it was shortened because high winds were anticipated by mid-morning. All of these flights took place on battery power and verified the design's handling qualities, performance, and structural integrity. Following these three flights, NASA decided to expand the aircraft into the Helios Prototype, with work starting in January, 1999.

Aircraft description
Although the Centurion shape resembled the Pathfinder, the structure was designed to be stronger and capable of carrying numerous payloads (up to ) more efficiently. The number of motors was increased to 14 and the number of underwing pods to carry batteries, flight control system components, ballast, and landing gear rose to four.

Specifications

See also
The prehistory of endurance UAVs
Electric aircraft
Regenerative fuel cell

 NASA Pathfinder (First flew in June 1983)
 NASA/AeroVironment Helios Prototype (First flight 8 September 1999)
 QinetiQ/Airbus Zephyr (First flight in 2008)
 Facebook Aquila (First flight	28 June 2016)
 SoftBank/AeroVironment HAPSMobile (First flight 11 September 2019) 
 BAE Systems PHASA-35 (First flight 17 February 2020)

References 
This article contains material that originally came from the web article "Unmanned Aerial Vehicles" by Greg Goebel, which exists in the Public Domain.

 "Photovoltaic Finesse: Better Solar Cells—with Wires Where the Sun Don't Shine", an article by Daniel Cho on page thirty-three of the September, 2003 issue of Scientific American

External links 

 NASA's Helios Project
 Helios for kids
 Helios model by DesignsbyALX .
 Science Daily article on Pathfinder Plus altitude record
 Telecom relay achievements at Airport International
 Space.com article
 History of solar powered UAVs at The Future of Things
 Pathfinder Plus at NASM
Helios crash article
 NASA-AeroVironment contract for followon projects
 Helios record attempt article
 NASA image collections:
 NASA Pathfinder 
 NASA Pathfinder Plus
 NASA Centurion
 NASA Helios Prototype

Centurion
NASA aircraft
Solar-powered aircraft
Unmanned aerial vehicles of the United States
1990s United States experimental aircraft
Fourteen-engined tractor aircraft
Flying wings
Aircraft first flown in 1998
High-altitude and long endurance aircraft